Balla Keita may refer to:

 Balla Moussa Keïta (1934–2001), Malian actor and comedian
 Balla Keita (Lieutenant General), United Nations Force Commander